Maples Mill is an unincorporated community in Fulton County, Illinois, United States. Maples Mill is located on Illinois Route 78 south of Dunfermline.

References

Unincorporated communities in Fulton County, Illinois
Unincorporated communities in Illinois